Choqa Kabud-e Olya (also Romanized as Choqā Kabūd-e ‘Olyā and Choqākabūd-e ‘Olyā) is a village in Sanjabi Rural District, Kuzaran District, Kermanshah County, Kermanshah Province, Iran. At the 2006 census, its population was 160, in 32 families.

References 

Populated places in Kermanshah County